The North Cape Yacht Club is a private yacht club located in La Salle Township, Michigan, on the shore of Western Lake Erie.

Regattas 
The club hosted recently the following competitions:
North American Championships
2002 Thistle
2004 Finn
2011 Lighting and J/35 
National Championships
2006 and 2010 Thistle
2006 Hobie 33 
2007 Catalina 22
2009 Highlander 
2010 A-Class light-weight catamarans 
2011 Snipe

Sailors  
NCYC is home of Anna Tunnicliffe, ICSA Women’s College Sailor of the Year in 2005, ISAF Rolex World Sailor of the Year in 2009 and 2011, and US Sailing’s Rolex Yachtswoman of the Year in 2008, 2009, 2010 and 2011.

Awards  
North Cape was honored by U.S. Sailing with the award of One-Design Yacht Club of the Year for 2011.

References

External links 
 Official website

1962 establishments in Michigan
Sailing in Michigan 
Yacht clubs in the United States